Musa Kamuren is an Anglican bishop in Kenya: from 2015 he was the Suffragan Bishop of Nakuru; and from 2018 he was Bishop of the newly created Diocese of Baringo.

References

21st-century Anglican bishops of the Anglican Church of Kenya
Anglican bishops of Baringo
Year of birth missing (living people)
Living people
Anglican bishops of Nakuru